Jacques-Eugène Feyen (1815 in Bey-sur-Seille, Meurthe-et-Moselle – 1908 in Paris) was a French painter.

Career
The elder brother of painter Auguste Feyen-Perrin, Jacques-Eugène enrolled at the École des Beaux-Arts and studied under Paul Delaroche. He had a notable career at the Paris Salon from 1841 to 1882. 
Vincent van Gogh was a fan of Feyen and describes him as, "one of the few painters who pictures intimate modern life as it really is, and does not turn it into fashion plates." He set up studio and settled in summer in the town of Cancale. He spent several months every year painting views of Cancale, the  oyster-picking Cancalaises and the bay of Mont Saint-Michel, and his paintings still enjoy a steady fame.

References

External links

Feyen Illustrations at Art Renewal Center

People from Meurthe-et-Moselle
1815 births
1908 deaths
Burials at Montmartre Cemetery
19th-century French painters
French male painters
20th-century French painters
20th-century French male artists
19th-century French male artists